The 1988 Campeonato Paulista da Primeira Divisão de Futebol Profissional was the 87th season of São Paulo's top professional football league. Corinthians won the championship by the 20th time. no teams were relegated.

Championship
The twenty teams of the championship were divided into two groups of ten teams, with each team playing once against the teams of its own group and the other group. The four best teams of each group would qualify to the Second phase, where the eight teams would be divided into two groups of four, with the winner of each group qualifying to the Finals.

First phase

Group 1

Group 2

Second phase

Group A

Group B

Finals

|}

References

Campeonato Paulista seasons
Paulista